The Diocese of Rottenburg-Stuttgart is a Latin Church ecclesiastical territory or diocese of the Catholic Church in Germany. It is a suffragan in the ecclesiastical province of the metropolitan Archdiocese of Freiburg in Baden-Württemberg, Bundesland. It covers the same territory of the former Kingdom of Wurttemberg.

History 
 In 1803 a Vicar General for the "New" State of Wurttemberg was nominated by Prince Primate Karl Theodor von Dalberg as an auxiliary bishop (Franz Karl Joseph Furst von Hohenlohe-Waldenburg-Schillingfurst, that consacreted the current Co-Cathedral in Stuttgart,  later Bishop of Augsburg )
 The Diocese of Rottenburg was established on 16 August 1821 through the papal bull De salute animarum, on territory split off from the suppressed Diocese of Konstanz. With the enthronement of the first bishop, Johann Baptist von Keller, on May 20, 1828, the formation of the diocese was complete.
 On 18 January 1978, the bishopric was renamed to the current title Diocese of Rottenburg-Stuttgart.

Major churches 

 The St. Martin's Cathedral is the episcopal see in Rottenburg
 The Co-cathedral is St. Eberhard in Stuttgart
 It also has three minor basilicas : 
 the former Cathedral of Ellwangen Abbey ( ex territorial abbey), Basilika St. Vitus, in Ellwangen, first seat of the General Vicar of Wurttemberg 
 Basilika St. Martin, in Ulm's Benedictine Wiblingen Abbey 
 Basilika St. Martin von Tours und St. Oswald, in Weingarten, Württemberg.
 Another World Heritage Site (born Catholic, later Lutheran seminary and school) is the former Cistercian monastery Kloster Maulbronn, in Maulbronn.

Episcopal ordinaries

(all Roman Rite)

Suffragan Bishops of Rottenburg 
 Johann Baptist von Keller January 28, 1828 – death October 17, 1845; previously Auxiliary Bishop of Augsburg (Germany) (1816.06.15 – 1828.01.28) and Titular Bishop of Evaria (1816.07.22 – 1828.01.28)
  June 14, 1847 – death May 3, 1869
 Karl Joseph von Hefele June 17, 1869 – death June 5, 1893
  June 5, 1893 – death May 11, 1898; succeeded as former Titular Bishop of Ænos (1886.08.31 – 1893.06.05) and Coadjutor Bishop of Rottenburg (1886.08.31 – 1893.06.05)
 Father Franz Xaver von Linsenmann July 20, 1898 – September 21, 1898; never consecrated Bishop
  November 11, 1898 – death July 16, 1926
 Johannes Baptista Sproll March 29, 1927 – death March 4, 1949; succeeded as former Titular Bishop of Halmyrus (1916.03.03 – 1927.03.29) and Auxiliary Bishop of Rottenburg (1916.03.03 – 1927.03.29)
 Auxiliary Bishop: Franz Joseph Fischer (1929.12.19 – death 1958.07.24), Titular Bishop of Zuri (1929.12.19 – 1958.07.24)
 Carl Joseph Leiprecht July 4, 1949 – retired June 4, 1974, previously Titular Bishop of Scyrus (1948.10.07 – 1949.07.04) as Auxiliary Bishop of Rottenburg (1948.10.07 – 1949.07.04); died 1981
 Auxiliary Bishop: Wilhelm Sedlmeier (1953.02.07 – retired 1976), Titular Bishop of Aulon (1953.02.07 – death 1987.02.24)
 Auxiliary Bishop: Anton Herre (1970.10.12 – retired 1985.12.31), Titular Bishop of Galazia in Campania (1970.10.12 – death 1993.09.24)

Suffragan Bishops of Rottenburg-Stuttgart 
 Georg Moser March 12, 1975 – death May 9, 1988; previously Titular Bishop of Thiges (1970.10.12 – 1975.03.12) as Auxiliary Bishop of Rottenburg (1970.10.12 – 1975.03.12)
 Auxiliary Bishop: Franz Josef Kuhnle ((1976.10.13 – retired 1990.11.07), Titular Bishop of Sorres (1976.10.13 – ...)
 Auxiliary Bishop: Bernhard Rieger (1984.12.20 – retired 1996.07.31), Titular Bishop of Tigava (1984.12.20 – death 2013.04.10)
 Walter Kasper April 17, 1989 – retired May 31, 1999; also Secretary of Pontifical Council for Promoting Christian Unity (1999.03.16 – 2001.02.21), created Cardinal-Deacon of Ognissanti in Via Appia Nuova (2001.02.21 [2001.03.25] – 2011.02.21), President of Pontifical Council for Promoting Christian Unity (2001.03.03 – 2010.07.01), President of Commission for Religious Relations with the Jews (2001.03.03 – 2010.07.01), promoted Cardinal-Priest of above Ognissanti in Via Appia Nuova as pro hac vice Title (2011.02.21 – ...)
 Auxiliary Bishop: Johannes Kreidler (1991.06.06 – retired 2017.03.02), Titular Bishop of Edistiana (1991.06.06 – ...)
 Auxiliary Bishop: Thomas Maria Renz (1997.04.29 – ...), Titular Bishop of Rucuma (1997.04.29 – ...)
 Gebhard Fürst July 7, 2000 – ...) incumbent
 Auxiliary Bishop: Bishop-elect Matthäus Karrer (2017.03.02 – ...), Titular Bishop of Tunnuna (2017.03.02 – ...).

Statistics and extent 
The Diocese of Rottenburg-Stuttgart is located in the Württemberg part of the German State of Baden-Württemberg. As per 2014, it pastorally served 1,872,849 Catholics (37.0% of 5,068,000 total) on 19,500 km2 in 1,096 parishes and 40 missions with 1,016 priests (829 diocesan, 187 religious), 283 deacons, 3,368 lay religious (228 brothers, 3,140 sisters) and 26 seminarians.

Deaneries 
It comprises 45 deaneries :

Aalen          
Backnang       
Balingen       
Biberach
Böblingen      
Calw           
Ehingen        
Ellwangen      
Esslingen-Nürtingen      
Freudenstadt   
Friedrichshafen
Geislingen  
Göppingen      
Heidenheim     
Heilbronn    
Hohenlohe
Laupheim       
Leutkirch      
Ludwigsburg    
Mergentheim  
Mühlacker
Neckarsulm     
Neresheim      
Oberndorf    
Ochsenhausen           
Ravensburg             
Reutlingen             
Riedlingen             
Rottenburg am Neckar             
Rottweil               
Saulgau                
Schwäbisch Gmünd       
Schwäbisch Hall        
Spaichingen            
Stuttgart-Bad Cannstatt
Stuttgart-Filder 
Stuttgart-Mitte (centre)     
Stuttgart-Nord (north)        
Tuttlingen             
Ulm                    
Waiblingen             
Waldsee      
Wangen    
Zwiefalten

See also
 List of Catholic dioceses in Germany

References

Sources and external links
  Diocesan website
 GCatholic.org
 
 Some information in this article is based on that in its German equivalent.

Roman Catholic dioceses in Germany
Rottenburg am Neckar
Roman Catholic dioceses and prelatures established in the 19th century
Christianity in Baden-Württemberg
1821 establishments in Germany
Religious organizations established in 1821